A number of motor vessels have been named Agios Georgios, including:

, a coaster
, a ro-ro ferry 

Ship names